Kopharad is a census town in Palghar district in the Indian state of Maharashtra.

Demographics
 India census, Kopharad had a population of 5,267. Males constitute 51% of the population and females 49%. Kopharad has an average literacy rate of 82%, higher than the national average of 59.5%: male literacy is 87%, and female literacy is 76%. In Kopharad, 10% of the population is under 6 years of age.

References

Cities and towns in Thane district